Jean-Julien Rojer and Horia Tecău were the defending champions, and successfully defended their title, defeating James Cerretani and Leander Paes in the final, 6–4, 6–2.

Seeds

Draw

Draw

References

Sources
 Main Draw

Winston-Salem Open - Doubles
2018 Doubles